The name Maliksi, a Filipino adjective meaning "agile", has been used for two tropical cyclones in the northwestern Pacific Ocean. The name replaced "Bilis", which was retired by the ESCAP/WMO Typhoon Committee following the 2006 typhoon season.

 Severe Tropical Storm Maliksi (2012) (T1219, 20W) – storm's center passed over Iwo To (Iwo Jima)
 Severe Tropical Storm Maliksi (2018) (T1805, 06W, Domeng) – remained at sea, but  brought rainfall to the Philippines and to Japan

Pacific typhoon set index articles